Methanogenium is a genus of archaeans in the family Methanomicrobiaceae. The type species is Methanogenium cariaci.

Description and habitat

The species within Methanogenium are coccoid in shape and Gram-negatives and, like other methanogenic archaea, they produce methane from carbon dioxide, hydrogen or formate as substrates. Although they occasionally have flagella, they are non-motile.  They are strictly anaerobic, and can be found in marine and lake sediments that lack oxygen.

Phylogeny
The currently accepted taxonomy is based on the List of Prokaryotic names with Standing in Nomenclature (LPSN) and National Center for Biotechnology Information (NCBI).

See also
 List of Archaea genera

References

Further reading

Scientific journals

Scientific books

Scientific databases

External links

Archaea genera
Euryarchaeota